Jean-Philippe Séchet (born 16 July 1965) is a French professional football manager and former player who played as an attacking midfielder. As of 2021, he is the manager of Régional 1 club US Saint-Flour.

Personal life 
During the 2000s decade, while simultaneously being a football manager, Séchet was the director of a publicity company. He founded the company with an associate and his wife in 2003. He also worked as a commentator on the radio for FC Metz.

Honours

Player 
Paris Saint-Germain
 Coupe de France: 1994–95
 Coupe de la Ligue: 1994–95

Manager 
FC Toul
 Division d'Honneur: 2006–07

Notes

References

External links 
 
 

1965 births
Living people
Sportspeople from La Tronche
French footballers
Association football midfielders
French football managers
FC Échirolles players
Grenoble Foot 38 players
FC Gueugnon players
AS Nancy Lorraine players
FC Metz players
Paris Saint-Germain F.C. players
AS Saint-Étienne players
1. FC Saarbrücken players
Ligue 2 players
French Division 3 (1971–1993) players
Ligue 1 players
Luxembourg National Division players
French expatriate footballers
Expatriate footballers in Germany
Expatriate footballers in Luxembourg
French expatriate football managers
Expatriate football managers in Luxembourg
French expatriate sportspeople in Germany
French expatriate sportspeople in Luxembourg
FC RM Hamm Benfica managers
Stade de Reims non-playing staff
US Raon-l'Étape managers
UMS Montélimar managers
Footballers from Auvergne-Rhône-Alpes